Lakshman or Laxman is a common Indian name, most commonly used as a masculine given name. It derives from Lakshmana, the character of the Ramayana epic.

Given name

 Lakshmana (Chahamana dynasty), 10th century Indian king
 Lakshman, Tamil film director
 Lakshman Kadirgamar, Sri Lankan politician
 Lakshman Kiriella, Sri Lankan politician
 Laxman Narasimhan, Indian businessman, CEO-designate of Starbucks
 Lakshman Senewiratne, Sri Lankan politician
 Lakshman Sen, king of Bengal
 Laxman Singh, ruler of princely state of Dungarpur from 1918 to 1989
 Lakshman Singh (politician) (born 1955), Indian politician
 Lakshman Singh (scouting) (1911-1994), Indian leader in the Scout movement
 Laxman Sivaramakrishnan, Indian cricketer and commentator
 Lakshman Yapa Abeywardena, Sri Lankan politician

Surname

 Bangaru Laxman, Indian politician
 R.K. Laxman, Indian cartoonist
 V. V. S. Laxman, Indian cricketer, batsman

See also

Indian masculine given names
Nepalese given names
Tamil masculine given names
Indian surnames